The Capivara River is a river of Minas Gerais state in southeastern Brazil. It is a tributary of the Araçuaí River.

See also
 List of rivers of Minas Gerais

References
 Map from Ministry of Transport
 Rand McNally, The New International Atlas, 1993.

Rivers of Minas Gerais